The Women's National Basketball League Grand Final Most Valuable Player (MVP) is an annual Women's National Basketball League (WNBL) award given to the best player of the Grand Final. Since 2014, the award has been known as the Rachael Sporn Medal, named after Adelaide's most recognised and successful WNBL player, Rachael Sporn, also a twice winner of the award. Lauren Jackson has won the award four times, while Kelsey Griffin has won the award three times.

Winners

Multi-time winners

See also

NBL Grand Final Most Valuable Player Award

References

External links

Women's National Basketball League awards